Tô or To is a Vietnamese surname.

List of persons with the surname
 Tô Hiến Thành, an official in the royal court of the Lý dynasty
 Tô Trung Từ, a high-ranking general and attempted usurper of the Lý dynasty
 Tô Ngọc Vân, painter
 Tô Vĩnh Diện, Viet Minh during the First Indochina War between France and Vietnam
 Tô Lâm, Vietnamese police officer

See also

 Tó, Portuguese nickname
 To (surname), other surnames Anglicized as "To"
 To (disambiguation)

Vietnamese-language surnames

vi:Tô (họ)